Pete 'n' Tillie is a 1972 American comedy-drama film directed by Martin Ritt and starring Walter Matthau and Carol Burnett. Its advertising tagline was: "Honeymoon's over. It's time to get married."

Screenwriter Julius J. Epstein was nominated for an Oscar for adapting the story from the 1968 novella Witch's Milk by Peter De Vries.  Epstein later adapted another De Vries novel for the film Reuben, Reuben.

Plot 
Tillie Schlaine is introduced to Pete Seltzer at a party. Her friends Gertrude and Burt are the hosts and attempting to fix her up.

Pete is a confirmed bachelor with eccentric habits. When he isn't doing odd motivational research for a San Francisco firm, he plays ragtime piano, and makes bad puns. He periodically pops in and out of Tillie's life, going days without calling, but showing up spontaneously at her door. When they finally make love, he learns Tillie is a virgin.

It appears Pete might still be seeing other women, but when he gets a promotion at work, Tillie announces it's time to get married. They do, then buy a house, and have a baby boy. Pete's affairs, however, apparently continue, Tillie even needing to discourage one of his young lovers at lunch.

Years go by until one day, 9-year-old son Robbie is stricken with a fatal illness. Pete tries to shield the boy by keeping him in what Tillie calls "a world of nonsense", but the inevitable death destroys Tillie's religious faith, and ruptures their marriage.

Tillie abstains from sex, while Pete turns to drink and takes an apartment. Tillie's depression is alleviated a bit by a friendship with Jimmy, who is gay, but willing to marry her if that would make Tillie happy. When she and Jimmy conspire to make Gertrude reveal her true age at long last, the result is a public brawl between the two women.

Tillie ends up in a sanitarium. Her life has come to a standstill until Pete turns up one day. When she sees the way their son's death affects him, after his years of hiding it, Tillie and Pete leave side by side.

Cast 
Walter Matthau as Pete Seltzer
Carol Burnett as Tillie Schlaine
Geraldine Page as Gertrude Wilson 
Barry Nelson as Burt Wilson
René Auberjonois as Jimmy Twitchell
Lee H. Montgomery as Robbie Seltzer
Kent Smith as Father Keating

Reception 
The film grossed $14,999,969 at the box office, earning an estimated $8.7 million in North American rentals in 1973.

Awards and nominations 
It was nominated for two Academy Awards: Julius J. Epstein for Best Adapted Screenplay, and Geraldine Page for Supporting Actress.

Walter Matthau received a Golden Globe nomination for Best Actor – Motion Picture Musical or Comedy, and won the 1973 BAFTA Award for Best Actor in a Leading Role for his performance in this movie and for his performance in Charley Varrick.

Carol Burnett received a Golden Globe Award nomination for Best Actress - Motion Picture Musical or Comedy.

See also
 List of American films of 1972

References

External links 
 
 
 

1970s American films
1970s English-language films
1970s romantic comedy-drama films
1972 films
1972 LGBT-related films
American LGBT-related films
American romantic comedy-drama films
Fictional married couples
Films about marriage
Films based on American novels
Films directed by Martin Ritt
Films scored by John Williams
Films set in San Francisco
Films shot in San Francisco
Films with screenplays by Julius J. Epstein
LGBT-related romantic comedy-drama films
Universal Pictures films